Rostamiyeh (also Romanized as Rostamīyeh) is a village in Shalahi Rural District, in the Central District of Abadan County, Khuzestan Province, Iran. At the 2006 census, its population was 208, in 42 families.

References 

Populated places in Abadan County